(The) Invincible Iron Man may refer to:

 Iron Man, a Marvel Comics superhero
 The Invincible Iron Man (comics), a 2008 Marvel comic book series
 The Invincible Iron Man (video game), a 2002 video game
 The Invincible Iron Man (film), a 2004 animated film
 Iron Man (vol. 4), a 2005 Marvel comic book series formerly known as The Invincible Iron Man
 Invincible Iron Man, a 2016 Marvel comic book series

See also 

 Iron Man (disambiguation)